Andrina is a 1981 television play based on a short story by George MacKay Brown, adapted and directed by Bill Forsyth for BBC Scotland.

Plot
A retired sea captain living alone in a remote cottage in Orkney is befriended by a young girl, Andrina, who asks him for a love story from his past. He repeatedly refuses to tell her, until he eventually succumbs, when the consequences are not as he expected.

Cast
 Cyril Cusack as Captain Bill Torvald
 Wendy Morgan as Andrina
 Sandra Voe as Tina Stewart
 Jimmy Yuill as Stanley
 Dave Anderson as Isaac

References

External links

1981 television plays
BBC television dramas
English-language television shows
Films directed by Bill Forsyth
Plays set in Scotland
Television shows based on short fiction
Scottish plays